Acantholycosa dudkorum is a species of wolf spider only known from the south-central Altai Mountains in Russia.

This spider is up to 9.8 mm in length. It is dark brown with a black head and yellow-brown spots on the upper legs. It is very similar to Acantholycosa dudkoromani and they may be conspecific.

References

Lycosidae
Spiders described in 2003
Spiders of Russia